The 2019–20 FIBA Europe Cup play-offs began on 4 March and would have concluded on 29 April 2020 with the 2020 FIBA Europe Cup Finals, to decide the champions of the 2019–20 FIBA Europe Cup. A total of eight teams were to compete in the play-offs.

On 16 June 2020, FIBA Europe announced the season was declared void and would not be finished.

Format
Each tie in the knockout phase, is played over two legs, with each team playing one leg at home.

The draw was made with the only restriction that these lucky losers could not be paired against each other, being decided all the bracket by the luck of the draw in the round of 16.

Qualified teams
The four group winners and second-placed teams from the second round advanced to the play-offs. Since this season, there were not transfer from the Champions League.

Standings

Bracket

Quarterfinals
The first legs were played on 4 March, and the second legs were played on 11 March 2020. Team 2 played the second leg at home.

|}

First leg

Second leg

Semifinals
The first legs were to be played on 25 March, and the second legs were to be played on 1 April 2019. Team 2 played the second leg at home.

|}

First leg

Second leg

Final

The first leg were to be played on 22 April, and the second leg were to be played on 29 April 2020. Team 2 played the second leg at home.

|}

References

External links
 

2019–20 FIBA Europe Cup
FIBA Europe Cup Play-offs